The following is a list of presidents of the Landtag of Hesse.

Presidents of the Landtag of the People's State of Hesse

President of the Beratende Landesauschuss

President of the Verfassunggebende Landesversammlung

Presidents of the Landtag

See also
List of presidents of the First Chamber of the States of the Grand Duchy of Hesse
List of presidents of the Second Chamber of the States of the Grand Duchy of Hesse

References

Landtag,Presidents
Lists of legislative speakers in Germany